John de Lancaster may refer to:

John of Lancaster, 1st Duke of Bedford, regent of France
John de Lancastre, 1st Baron Lancastre, medieval parliamentary baron
John de Lancaster (MP) for Lancashire (UK Parliament constituency)